Sovetsky (U Roŋgo) is an urban locality (an urban-type settlement) and the administrative center of Sovetsky District of the Mari El Republic, Russia. As of the 2010 Census, its population was 10,664.

Administrative and municipal status
Within the framework of administrative divisions, Sovetsky serves as the administrative center of Sovetsky District. As an administrative division, the urban-type settlement of Sovetsky, together with two rural localities, is incorporated within Sovetsky District as Sovetsky Urban-Type Settlement (an administrative division of the district). As a municipal division, Sovetsky Urban-Type Settlement is incorporated within Sovetsky Municipal District as Sovetsky Urban Settlement.

Miscellaneous
The largest orphanage in the Mari El Republic is located here, as well as a large TV broadcasting facility with a  guyed mast.

References

Notes

Sources

Urban-type settlements in the Mari El Republic